Usingeriessa tamanalis is a moth in the family Crambidae. It was described by William Schaus in 1924. It is found in Colombia.

References

Acentropinae
Moths described in 1924